William F. Hennessy (13 February 1882 – 21 November 1954) was an Irish hurler. His career included County Championship success with Dungourney and All-Ireland Championship titles with the Cork senior hurling team.

Honours

Dungourney
Cork Senior Hurling Championship (2): 1907, 1909

Cork
All-Ireland Senior Hurling Championship (2): 1902, 1903
Munster Senior Hurling Championship (5): 1903, 1904, 1905, 1907, 1912

References

1882 births
1954 deaths
Dungourney hurlers
Cork inter-county hurlers
All-Ireland Senior Hurling Championship winners